I Feel Good is a 2018 French comedy satire of both capitalism and communism directed by Benoît Delépine and Gustave de Kervern.

Plot
Jacques, an ambitious man pushed from the home by his old parents, decides one fine day to become rich and famous by exploiting the vein of low cost cosmetic surgery in Eastern Europe. To develop his business plan, he takes refuge with his sister Monique, director of an Emmaus village. By dint of giving them a better future, he will eventually take a whole group of companions to a clinic in Bulgaria, to all come back more beautiful.

Cast
 Jean Dujardin as Jacques Pora
 Yolande Moreau as Monique Pora
 Jean-Benoît Ugeux as Vincent

Production
Principal photography on the film began in August 2017 in Aquitaine. Sequences were shot in Romania at Nicolae Ceaușescu's Palace of the Parliament and in Bulgaria at the Buzludzha Monument.

References

External links
 

2018 films
2018 comedy films
French comedy films
Belgian comedy films
German comedy films
American comedy films
2010s French-language films
French satirical films
Films directed by Benoît Delépine
Films directed by Gustave Kervern
Films shot in Bulgaria
Films shot in Romania
2010s satirical films
2010s American films
2010s French films
2010s German films